Scott McKnight is an American politician serving as a member of the Louisiana House of Representatives from the 68th district. Elected in November 2019, he assumed office on January 13, 2020.

Early life and education 
McKnight was born and raised in Baton Rouge, Louisiana. He earned a Bachelor of General Studies and Master of Business Administration from Louisiana State University.

Career 
McKnight joined BXS Insurance as a benefits consultant in 1999. He has since worked as vice president, director of business development, and president of the company. McKnight is also on the advisory board of Caddo Medical Products LLC. He was elected to the Louisiana House of Representatives in November 2019 and assumed office on January 13, 2020. In June 2022, McKnight declared his candidacy for Louisiana state treasurer.

References 

Living people
Year of birth missing (living people)
Republican Party members of the Louisiana House of Representatives
Louisiana State University alumni